Margaret Lindsay (1910–1981) was an American film, stage and television actress.

Margaret Lindsay may also refer to:

Margaret Lindsay (noblewoman) (1726–1782), Scottish noblewoman

See also

Lindsay (name)